is a Japanese politician in the Democratic Party of Japan (DPJ), a member of the House of Councillors in the Diet (national legislature).  A native of Takamatsu, Kagawa and graduate of Kobe University, she ran unsuccessfully for the House of Councillors in 2004. She ran again in 2007 and was elected for the first time. She left the DPJ in 2013 because of a difference of political policy.

External links 
  

Members of the House of Councillors (Japan)
Female members of the House of Councillors (Japan)
Panasonic
Politicians from Kagawa Prefecture
Living people
1967 births
Democratic Party of Japan politicians
People from Takamatsu, Kagawa